Francisco Badaró is a municipality in the northeast of the Brazilian state of Minas Gerais.  As of 2020 the population was 10,321 in a total area of 463 km². The elevation of the town center is 377 meters. It is part of the IBGE statistical mesoregion of Jequitinhonha and the micro-region of Capelinha. It became a municipality in 1962.

The economy is based on cattle raising and subsistence agriculture, with the main crops being beans, manioc, sugarcane, and corn.

Neighboring municipalities are Berilo, Jenipapo de Minas, Virgem da Lapa, Chapada do Norte, and Araçuaí. The distance to Belo Horizonte is 723 km.

Social Indicators

Francisco Badaró is ranked low on the MHDI and was one of the poorest municipalities in the state and in the country in 2000.
MHDI: .646 (2000)
State ranking: 755 out of 853 municipalities
National ranking: 3,831 out of 5,138 municipalities in 2000
Life expectancy: 67
Literacy rate: 68 
Combined primary, secondary and tertiary gross enrolment ratio: .705
Per capita income (monthly): R$87.00

The above figures can be compared with those of Poços de Caldas, which had an MHDI of .841, the highest in the state of Minas Gerais.  The highest in the country was São Caetano do Sul in the state of São Paulo with an MHDI of .919.  The lowest was Manari in the state of Pernambuco with an MHDI of .467 out of a total of 5504 municipalities in the country . At last count, Brazil had 5,561 municipalities.

See also
List of municipalities in Minas Gerais

References

External links
 :es:Francisco Badaró

Municipalities in Minas Gerais